Ayşe Kulin (born 26 August 1941) is a Turkish short story writer, screenwriter and novelist.

Biography 
Kulin was born in Istanbul in 1941. Her father, Muhittin Kulin, of Bosniak origin, was one of the first civil engineers in Istanbul who founded the State Hydraulic Works (DSİ); he was soon appointed first director of this institution. Her mother Sitare Hanım, a Circassian, was the granddaughter of one of the Ottoman economy ministers.

Kulin graduated from the American College for Girls in Arnavutköy, Istanbul. She released a collection of short stories titled  Güneşe Dön Yüzünü in 1984. A short story from this called Gülizar was made into a film titled Kırık Bebek in 1986, for which she won a screenplay award from the Ministry of Culture and Tourism. Kulin worked as a screenwriter, cinematographer  and producer for many films, television series and advertisements. In 1986, she won the "Best Cinematographer Award" from the Theatre Writers Association for her work in the television series Ayaşlı ve Kiracıları. In the 80s, she also took painting lessons from Yusuf Taktak.

In 1996, she wrote a biography of Münir Nurettin Selçuk titled Bir Tatlı Huzur.  With a short story called Foto Sabah Resimleri she won  the "Haldun Taner Short Story Award" the same year, and the "Sait Faik Short Story Award" the next year. In 1997, she was honored as the "Writer of the Year" by the İstanbul Communication Faculty for her biographical novel  Adı Aylin, She won the same award the next year for her short story Geniş Zamanlar. In November 1999, she wrote  a novel called Sevdalinka about the Bosnian War and in 2000,  a biographical novel called Füreyya. In June 2001, she put out a novel titled Köprü about drama in Turkey's eastern provinces and how they shaped the republic's early history.

In May 2002, Kulin  wrote a novel titled Nefes Nefes'e about the Turkish diplomats, who have saved the lives of Jews during the Holocaust in World War II.

She has been married twice, her latest novels Hayat and Hüzün describe her life with her spouses, Mehmet Sarper and Eren Kemahli. Both ended in divorce but she bore four sons from the marriages.

English language bibliography 
Several of Kulin's novels and one short story collection have been published in English language translation.

Photo "Sabah" Pictures
Photo "Sabah" Pictures (Turkish title: Foto Sabah Resimleri) is a 1998 collection of three inter-connected short stories, which was awarded the 1998 Haldun Taner Short Story Award, the 1999 Sait Faik Story Prize, and was republished in 2004 by Epsilon Yayınevi in English language translation by Martina Keskintepe.

Editions 
 

Last Train to Istanbul
Last Train to Istanbul (Turkish title: Nefes Nefese) is a 2002 novel, which was republished in 2006 by Everest Yayınları in English language translation by John W. Baker.

Editions
 

Aylin
Aylin (Turkish title: Adı: Aylin) is a 1997 novel, which was republished in 2007 by Remzi Kitabevi in English language translation by Dara Çolakoğlu.

Editions
 

Face to Face (Turkish title: Bir Gün) is a 2005 novel, which was republished in 2008 by Everest Yayınları in English language translation by John W. Baker.

Editions*
 

Farewell
Farewell (Turkish title: Veda) is a 2008 novel, which was republished in 2009 by Everest Yayınları in English language translation by Kenneth J. Dakan.

Editions

Bibliography 
 Güneşe Dön Yüzünü, 1984
 Bir Tatlı Huzur, 1996
 Adı: Aylin, 1997
 Geniş Zamanlar, 1998
 Foto Sabah Resimleri, 1998
 Sevdalinka, 1999
 Füreya, 2000
 Köprü, 2001
 Nefes Nefese, 2002
 İçimde Kızıl Bir Gül Gibi, 2002
 Babama, 2002
 Kardelenler, 2004
 Gece Sesleri, 2004
 Bir Gün, 2005
 Bir Varmış Bir Yokmuş, 2007
 Veda, 2008
 Sit Nene`nin Masalları, 2008
 Umut, 2008
 Taş Duvar Açık Pencere, 2009
 Türkan, 2009
 Hayat – Dürbünümde Kırk Sene (1941–1964), 2011
 Hüzün – Dürbünümde Kırk Sene (1964–1983), 2011
 Gizli Anların Yolcusu, 2011
 Bora'nın Kitabı, 2012
 Dönüş, 2013
 Hayal, 2014
 Handan, 2014
 Tutsak Güneş, 2016

External links 
 A biography of Ayşe Kulin
  Ayşe Kulin, Contemporary Turkish Literature

References

1941 births
Turkish people of Bosniak descent
Turkish people of Circassian descent
Alumni of Arnavutköy American High School for Girls
Writers from Istanbul
Turkish women short story writers
Turkish female screenwriters
Turkish women novelists
Living people
Turkish autobiographers
Women autobiographers